Sir Holberry Mensforth, KCB, CBE (1 May 1871 – 5 September 1951), engineer and engineering company executive.

His second son Sir Eric Mensforth was a pioneer of the British helicopter industry.

References 

 https://www.oxforddnb.com/display/10.1093/ref:odnb/9780198614128.001.0001/odnb-9780198614128-e-48057
 https://www.ukwhoswho.com/display/10.1093/ww/9780199540891.001.0001/ww-9780199540884-e-240702

External links 

 

1871 births
1951 deaths
Knights Commander of the Order of the Bath
Commanders of the Order of the British Empire
20th-century British engineers
20th-century British businesspeople